The 1988 United States Olympic trials for track and field were held at IU Michael A. Carroll Track & Soccer Stadium in Indianapolis, Indiana.  This is the only time this venue has been used for the Olympic trials.  With the 2013 installation of Field Turf, it is unlikely to host the event again.  Organised by The Athletics Congress (TAC), the nine-day competition lasted from July 15 to 23.  The national championships in track and field for the United States was a separate event that year, held a week earlier in Tampa, Florida, the last time the Olympic trials were not also the National Championships.  The women's Marathon Olympic trials were held on May 1 in Pittsburgh, Pennsylvania.  The men's Marathon trials were in Jersey City, New Jersey on April 24.  That same day, the 50K Racewalk trials were held adjacent to the stadium.

The results of the event determined qualification for the United States at the 1988 Summer Olympics held two and a half months later in Seoul, South Korea.

This meet is memorable as the site of Florence Griffith Joyner's world record 10.49 in the 100 metres.  The record race, in the quarterfinal round, has been questioned because of the wind reading of 0.0 even though video of the race shows flags extended in the background.  About the same time on a parallel runway, the final round of the men's triple jump was being conducted.  Willie Banks jumped  on his last attempt with a +5.2 wind reading,  That jump has only been surpassed three times by two individuals.  Over the four rounds, Griffith Joyner ran three separate races that are faster than any woman has ever run, except for her own, wind aided 10.54 +3.0 to win the 1988 Olympics.

This meet also had the only race where five men have run under 48 seconds for 400 metres hurdles.

1988 U.S. Olympic track and field trials results
1988 U.S. Olympic track and field trials results

Men
Key:
.

Men track events

Men field events

Women

Women track events

Semi Final 1 (Wind +1.6 mps)

Semi Final 2 (Wind +1.3 mps)

Quarter Final 1 (Wind +0.0 mps)

Quarter Final 2 (Wind +0.0 mps)

Quarter Final 3 (Wind +5.0 mps)

Heat 1 (Wind +3.2 mps)

Heat 2 (Wind +3.9 mps)

Heat 3 (Wind +2.7 mps)

Heat 4 (Wind +3.5 mps)

Quarter Final 1 (Wind -0.1 mps)

Women field events

References

External links
USA Track and Field

USA Outdoor Track and Field Championships
US Olympic Trials
Track, Outdoor
United States Summer Olympics Trials
Sports competitions in Indianapolis
United States Olympic trials
United States Olympic Trials (track and field)
Track and field in Indiana
Athletics at the 1988 Summer Olympics